The Harris County Flood Control District (HCFCD) is a government agency that was established to reduce the effects of flooding in Harris County, Texas, United States. The flood control district has its headquarters in Houston.

After destructive floods occurred in 1929 and 1935, residents of Harris County advocated for relief of flooding issues. The 45th Texas Legislature established the flood district on April 23, 1937, and the Harris County Commissioners Court was designated as the district's governing body.

Magnolia Bridge
The Magnolia Bridge was found responsible for the devastating flooding in 1935.

References

External links

 Harris County Flood Control District

County government agencies in Texas
Flood Control District